In molecular biology, the δ (delta) subunit of DNA polymerase III is encoded by the holA gene in E. coli and other bacteria.  Along with the γ, δ', χ, and ψ subunits that make up the core polymerase, and the β accessory proteins, the δ subunit is responsible for the high speed and processivity of polIII.

References 

Bacterial proteins
Protein families
DNA replication